Yoskar "El Prabu" Sarante (2 January 1970 – 28 January 2019) was a prominent Dominican bachata singer.

Early life
Yoskar Sarante, born in 1970, was one of the most prolific singers of new bachata of Santo Domingo in the Dominican Republic. Born to Domingo and Ramona Sarante Ventura, he was the second son of the family, but he was the first to be linked to art. According to Yoskar Sarante, the young artist said that as a child he would walk with his father in parks and public squares singing while his father accompanied him on guitar, and that it was their main source of income. He took his first steps into merengue and belonged to the International Grupo Melao a merengue band in the Dominican Republic. Yoskar Sarante participated in several competitions for children, highlighting the most popular program of the season "Mundo Infantil." He worked with the nueva bachata movement, and was included on compilations such as Bachata Tipico and The Rough Guide to Bachata. During his career, he was invited to sing for the mayor at the New York Mets stadium, which gained him some acclaim in the United States. He was widely known internationally, and his music deals with romantic topics.

Death
On January 28, 2019, he died from pneumonia due to a pulmonary fibrosis in a hospital in Orlando, Florida. He was surrounded by his loved ones.

Discography
Yoskar por siempre (2019)
No Me Digas (2016)
Dile A El (2016)
Quien Eres Tu (2015)
Espero por tu amor (2015)
Que Vaina Tan Difícil (2014)
Me Descuide (2013)
Le Pregunto al Amor (2012)
Cuidado Con La Envidia (2011)
La Insulina (2011)
Vuelve Vuelve (2008)
Parada 37 (2006)
Viví (2004)
No Es Casualidad (2002)
Llora Alma Mía (2000)
Si Fuera Ella (1998)
Niña Sedienta (1996)
El Prabu (1994)

References

1970 births
2019 deaths
21st-century Dominican Republic male singers
Bachata singers
People from Santo Domingo
Dominican Republic songwriters
20th-century Dominican Republic male singers
Spanish-language singers